Nandagopal Kidambi (born 26 December 1991) is an Indian male badminton player.

Personal life

He is the elder brother of Srikanth Kidambi, India's badminton player.

Achievements

BWF International Challenge/Series
Men's doubles

Mixed doubles

 BWF International Challenge tournament
 BWF International Series tournament
 BWF Future Series tournament

References

External links 
 

Living people
1991 births
Indian male badminton players
Racket sportspeople from Guntur